The Burning God is a grimdark fantasy novel written by R. F. Kuang and was published by Harper Voyager on November 17, 2020, as the third and final installment in her Poppy Wars trilogy.

Background 
The book was published on November 17, 2020, by Harper Voyager. R. F. Kuang states in an interview with Andrew Liptak that Rin is based on Mao Zedong. In the book, Rin is now the leader of the Southern Coalition, which is going to war with Vaisra.

Reception 
Publishers Weekly called the book "a satisfying if not happy end to the series." Similarly, Kirkus Reviews called it "A dark and devastating conclusion." Booklist called the book "a poignant conclusion" and included the book on their list of the best science fiction, fantasy, and horror novels of 2021. Library Journal commented on the book, saying that it had "terrific, flawed characters, and amazing worldbuilding." Elsa Sjunneson reviewed the book and said that she was "frustrated by the depictions of disability in this book."

References

External links 
 

2020 science fiction novels
Dark fantasy novels
Books by R.F. Kuang